Fozzy is the debut album of heavy metal band, Fozzy. The album was released on October 24, 2000. The album was released by Palm Pictures and Megaforce Records.

Album concept
 The album featured mostly cover songs by bands such as Dio, Twisted Sister, Iron Maiden, Ozzy Osbourne and Mötley Crüe, as Fozzy had a satirical back-story that they had spent the last 20 years in Japan being megastars and once they returned to America, they realized that many famous artists had ripped off their songs.

However, the album featured two original songs by Fozzy, "End of Days" and "Feel the Burn", in which it was implied that the band had just recently written these songs and other bands hadn't had the chance to "rip" these songs off them.

Release and reception

Prior to the album's release, Megaforce had high hopes for the record, as they expected wrestling fans of the Attitude Era boom period to flock to Fozzy and buy the record. However, the album failed commercially and only managed to sell 4,225 copies. The album also failed to chart on the Billboard 200. Due to the poor commercial reception of the album, Megaforce cancelled plans for the release of the album in Europe and a Fozzy documentary DVD as well as several other endorsements and appearances.

Singles
"Feel the Burn"
"End of Days"
"Eat the Rich"

Track listing

Personnel

Musicians

 Chris Jericho (credited as Moongoose McQueen) – lead vocals
 Rich Ward (credited as Duke LaRüe) – guitar, backing vocals
 Dan Dryden (credited as Shawn "Sports" Pop) – bass, backing vocals
 Frank Fontsere (credited as KK LaFlame) – drums
 Ryan Mallam (credited as The Kidd) – guitar

Additional musicians

 Butch Walker (Marvelous 3) - guitar solo and additional vocals on "Over the Mountain".
 Andy Sneap - Extra lead vocals on "Blackout".

Production

 Michael Alago - Executive Producer
 John Briglevich - Producer, Engineer
 Fozzy - Producers
 Andy Sneap - Mixer

References

External links
 Official website
 Palm Pictures official website
 Megaforce Records official website

2000 debut albums
Fozzy albums
Megaforce Records albums
Covers albums